This is an overview of the Profane Existence discography (Current as of 1/19/08).

001 Sofa Head - 1127 Walnut Ave. LP
001.5 Doom - Police Bastard 7-inch
002 Nausea - Extinction LP
003 Sofa Head - Invitation To Dinner 7-inch
004 Va - Nightmares of Reality 2×LP
005 Atavistic - Vanishing Point LP
006 Moral Suckling - Reach LP
007 Asbestosdeath - Dejection 7-inch
008 Hiatus - Way of Doom 7-inch
009 Pissed - S/T 7-inch
010 Internal Autonomy - Only You Have the Power 2×7″
011 Deprived / Resist - Fuck All Governments 7-inch
012 Natural Cause - Mess 7-inch
013 Va - Think Globally, Act Locally 2×7″
014 Va - In The Spirit of Total Resistance 2×7″
015 Negative Stance - Spectators of Decadence 7-inch
016 Resist - Ignorance is Bliss LP
017 Misery - Who's the Fool... The Fool Is Silent CD
018 Diskonto - Shattered Society 7-inch
019 State of the Union - Rez-Erection 7-inch
020 Christdriver - Blind 7-inch
021 Dead Silence - Hell, How Could We Make Any More Money Than This? 7-inch
022 Assrash - Save for Your Doomed Future 7-inch
023 State of Fear - Wallow in Squalor 7-inch
024 Doom - Fuck Peaceville 2×LP/CD
025 Publice Nuisance - Cheap Sex 'n' Booze 7-inch
026 Suicidal Supermarket Trolleys - Shut up and Drink LP
027 Coprofilia - Latinamerica: The Uniting Struggle Against Power 7-inch
031 Counterblast - Balance of Pain Cassette
032 Christdriver - Everything Burns Lp/CD
033 Assrash - Up The Punx LP
034 Civil Disobedience - Invention / Extinction LP
035 Disagree / Ungovernmental - Split 7-inch
036 Misery - Next Time / Midnight 7-inch
038 Children of Barren Wasteland - S/T 7-inch
039 State of Fear - The Tables Will Turn... And it's You Who is Going to Suffer LP
042 Defiance - No Time 7-inch
044 Servitude - Apparatus 7-inch
045 State of the Union - S/T LP
047 Manual Seven - The Shattering 7-inch
048 React - Disturbing the Souls of Buried Rage 7-inch
049 Detestation - S/T CD
053 Brother Inferior / Whorehouse of Representatives - Split 7-inch
056 Detestation - Blood of the Gods 7-inch
057 Decrepit - Tired of Licking Blood from a Spoon LP
058 A//Political - Punk is a Ghetto 7-inch
059 Phobia / Resist and Exist - Split LP
060 Provoked - Infant in the Womb of Warfare LP/CD
061 Another Oppressive System / Human Waste - Split 7-inch
062 Disrespect - S/T 7-inch
063 Garmonbozia - S/T LP/CD
064 Iskra - S/T LP
065 Extinction of Mankind - The Nightmare Seconds... LP
066 Witch Hunt - ...As Priorities Decay LP/CD
067 State of Fear - Discography LP/CD
068 Witch Hunt - Eps & Crucial Chaos Radio Session CD
069 Disrespect - Justice in a Bag 7-inch
070 Saint Bushmill's Choir - S/T LP
071 Behind Enemy Lines - Know Your Enemy LP/CD
072 Misery - Next Time / Who's The Fool... CD
073 Ballast - Sound Asleep LP/CD
074 Disrespect - 2004 Recordings CD
075 The Cooters - Punk Metal CD
076 Provoked - Prepare for the Cold LP/CD
077 Hellshock - Warlord 7-inch/CD
078 Another Oppressive System - 2000–2004: The First Four Years CD
079 Disrespect - Wartorn 7-inch
080 Disrespect - We Are The Punx 7-inch
081 The Cooters - Chaos or Bust CD
081.5 The Cooters - Bustin Loose 7-inch
082 Cop on Fire / Visions of War split LP
083 Imperial Leather - Something Out of Nothing CD/LP
084 Thought Crime - Its All in Your Head LP
085 Kakistocracy - Cast Aside Your Chains and Dance LP
086 Migra Violenta - Holocausto Capitalista LP
087 Murder Disco Experience - Ground Zero: Stuttgart CD/LP
088 State of the Union - In The Bitter End... A Discography CD
089 V/A - They've Taken Everything: In Memory of Stig 22 August 1962 – 23 October 2004 double CD
090 Ass - Sink CD
091
092 Human Error - Life Sentence CD
093 Witch Hunt - Blood-Red States LP/CD
094 Today's Overdose - S/T 7-inch
095 Imperial Leather - Antibodies 7-inch
096 Appalachian Terror Unit - Armageddon Won't Be Brought By Gods... 7-inch
097 Happy Bastards - Box of Hard Knocks CD
098 Behind Enemy Lines - One Nation Under The Iron Fist of God LP/CD
099 Extinction of Mankind - Northern Scum LP / CD
099.5 Wartorn - Prey For Salvation 7-inch
100 Mouth Sewn Shut - Dommed Future Today LP (CD on Rodent Popsicle)
101 Iskra - Selected Works CD
102 Blackout - S/T CD
102.5 Filthpact - Total Crust Violence CD
103 Murder Disco Experience - Complete Discography 1997-2004 CD
104 Warcollapse - Defy! LP/CD
105 Appalachian Terror Unit/Wartorn - Split CD
106 Blackout "Stop the Clock" CD
107 Imperial Leather "Do You Know Where Your Children Are?" CD/LP
108 Massmord / Shades of Grey split LP
109 Resistant Culture "Welcome to Reality" LP
110 Resist "Resistography" double CD
111 Wartorn "Tainting Tomorrow With the Blood of Yesterday" LP
111.5 Remission "Ninety-Five to Ninety-Eight" CD
112 Happy Bastards / The Cooters split 7-inch
113 Appalachian Terror Unit "Greenwashing" LP
113.5 Remission "Absolute Power" 7-inch

Discographies of American artists
Punk rock group discographies